William Olcott may refer to:
 William J. Olcott (1862–1935), American football player and mining and railroad executive
 William Tyler Olcott (1873–1936), American lawyer and amateur astronomer 
 William M. K. Olcott (1862–1933), American lawyer and politician from New York City